Bradley is a former civil parish, now in the parishes of Tushingham-cum-Grindley, Macefen and Bradley and Malpas in Cheshire West and Chester, England.  It contains five buildings that are recorded in the National Heritage List for England as designated listed buildings, all of which are at Grade II.  This grade is the lowest of the three gradings given to listed buildings and is applied to "buildings of national importance and special interest".  The parish is entirely rural, and the listed buildings consist of two farmhouses and a farm building, (all dating from the 17th century and basically timber-framed) and two guideposts from the 19th century.

See also
Listed buildings in Wirswall
Listed buildings in Marbury cum Quoisley
Listed buildings in Malpas
Listed buildings in Wigland
Listed buildings in Chidlow

References

Listed buildings in Cheshire West and Chester
Lists of listed buildings in Cheshire
Listed buildings in Bradley